Gary Martin Allenson (born February 4, 1955) is an American former Major League Baseball catcher and coach and minor league manager. In , he spent a second stint as manager of the New Hampshire Fisher Cats of the Double-A Eastern League, after serving the previous three seasons in that role with the Triple-A Buffalo Bisons of the International League. Both are affiliates of the Toronto Blue Jays.

In October 2017, Allenson and the Blue Jays severed their relationship. A former backup catcher for the Blue Jays, he had been a member of the Toronto player development organization since January 7, 2013.

Playing career

Nicknamed "Muggsy," Allenson was born in Culver City, California, and graduated from nearby Lawndale High School. He played college baseball for the Arizona State Sun Devils, then was selected by the Boston Red Sox in the ninth round of the 1976 amateur draft. In 1978, his third season of professional baseball, he was named the International League's All-Star catcher and Most Valuable Player after slugging 20 home runs and hitting .299 in 133 games played.

During his rookie  season in the Majors, Allenson was the Red Sox' most-used starting catcher, filling in for injured veteran and future Baseball Hall of Famer Carlton Fisk. For the remainder of his playing tenure (1979–85) in the Major Leagues, however, he was a backup for the Red Sox (1980–81; 1984) and Blue Jays (1985). The ,  Allenson batted and threw right-handed. In a seven-season MLB career, he posted a .221 batting average with 235 hits, 19 home runs and 131 RBI in 416 games played.

Coaching/managing career
Allenson began his minor league managerial career in 1987 with the Oneonta Yankees of the New York Yankees farm system. Compiling an 89–62 record in two years, he led the team to the New York – Penn League championship in 1988.

He returned to the Red Sox organization in 1989, first managing at Lynchburg for two seasons (128–146) and then New Britain for one (47–93). He was promoted to Boston, serving as bullpen coach in 1992 and 1993 and third-base coach in 1994.

He returned to the minors in 1996, managing the Charleston RiverDogs, then a Texas Rangers affiliate, to a 63–78 record, moving on to the Houston Astros farm system the following year to manage the Jackson Generals to a 66–73 mark.

He then spent the next five campaigns in the Milwaukee Brewers organization, the first two leading Louisville, known as the Redbirds in 1998 and the RiverBats in 1999, to a combined 140–148 mark. He was brought up to Milwaukee, where he was the first-base coach in 2000 and the third-base coach in 2001 and 2002.

A 77–57 campaign in 2005 at the helm of the Carolina Mudcats, then a Florida Marlins affiliate, was sandwiched between two stints in the Baltimore Orioles organization. He managed the Ottawa Lynx to a 79–65 finish in 2003. After a 31–37 year as skipper of the Bluefield Orioles in 2006, he returned to the International League to manage the Norfolk Tides to a combined 228–254 in a little over  seasons. Allenson was promoted to Baltimore as its third-base coach on June 4, 2010, when Juan Samuel was promoted to interim manager upon the firing of Dave Trembley. Allenson returned to manage the Tides in  then was the  manager of the Aberdeen IronBirds, the Orioles' Short Season-Class A affiliate.

He was reappointed manager of the Fisher Cats on January 17, 2017.

Through 2016, Allenson had compiled a career 1,311–1,440 (.477) record over 22 seasons as a minor league manager.

References

External links

1955 births
Living people
American expatriate baseball players in Canada
Arizona State Sun Devils baseball players
Baltimore Orioles coaches
Baseball coaches from California
Baseball players at the 1975 Pan American Games
Baseball players from California
Boston Red Sox coaches
Boston Red Sox players
Bristol Red Sox players
Buffalo Bisons (minor league) managers
International League MVP award winners
Louisville Redbirds managers 
Louisville Bats managers 
Major League Baseball catchers
Major League Baseball bullpen coaches
Major League Baseball first base coaches
Major League Baseball third base coaches
Milwaukee Brewers coaches
New Hampshire Fisher Cats managers
Norfolk Tides managers
Pan American Games medalists in baseball
Pan American Games silver medalists for the United States
Pawtucket Red Sox players
People from Culver City, California
Sun City Rays players
Syracuse Chiefs players
Toronto Blue Jays players
Winter Haven Red Sox players
Winter Haven Super Sox players
Sportspeople from Los Angeles County, California
Lawndale High School alumni
Medalists at the 1975 Pan American Games